Tattykeeran may refer to:

Tattykeeran, County Fermanagh, a townland in County Fermanagh, Northern Ireland
Tattykeeran, County Tyrone, a townland in County Tyrone, Northern Ireland